Little Malvern is a small village and civil parish in Worcestershire, England. It is situated on the lower slopes of the Malvern Hills, south of Malvern Wells, near Great Malvern, the major centre of the area often referred to as The Malverns. Little Malvern shares a parish council with Welland, with 2 of the 11 councillors.

History and features

The village contains a Romanesque church called Little Malvern Priory, after a Benedictine monastery that existed on the site c.1171-1537. Next to the church is the historic house, Little Malvern Court, home to the Berington family for over four centuries. The gardens of Little Malvern court are occasionally open to the public.

According to a book published in 1848, an important find of brass Roman coins was unexpectedly made in 1847 in Little Malvern by a Mr Commissioner Mayne and his sons who were out walking in search of geological items of interest.

Transport
The nearest railway station is Colwall, however Great Malvern is more typically more direct to reach; both are on the same line.

Notable people
Rear Admiral Basil Place VC, recipient of the Victoria Cross, was born in Little Malvern.

The composer Edward Elgar and his wife Alice are buried at St Wulstan's Roman Catholic Church, and singer Jenny Lind lived at Wynd's Point, behind the priory, during her final years.

References

External links
Welland and Little Malvern Parish Council

Villages in Worcestershire
Civil parishes in Worcestershire